KWFL (99.3 FM, Family Life Radio) is a radio station broadcasting a Contemporary Inspirational music format. Licensed to Roswell, New Mexico, United States.  The station is currently owned by Family Life Broadcasting System.

References

External links
 
 

WFL
Family Life Radio stations
WFL